, also known by his Chinese style name , was a bureaucrat of the Ryukyu Kingdom.

There were few details about his parents and family background even they were not recorded in his genealogy book. Kunigami was a son-in-law of Urasoe Ryōken. He was appointed  in 1554. He served as Sanshikan during King Shō Gen's reign. 

He was dispatched as congratulatory envoy together with Ryō Gen to celebrate the Longqing Emperor's coronation in 1568, and sailed back two years later.

Kunigami Seijun was the originator of Ō-uji Nagayama Dunchi, which was one of the "Five Aristocratic Families" in Ryukyuan history.

References

|-

People of the Ryukyu Kingdom
Ryukyuan people
16th-century Ryukyuan people
Ueekata
Sanshikan
1511 births
1580 deaths